A formation light is a type of thin film electroluminescent light that assists aircraft flying in formation in low visibility environments.

See also

 Navigation light
 Landing lights

References 

Light sources
Lighting
Luminescence
Aircraft external lights